The 2012–13 season will be Győri ETO FC's 69th competitive season, 53rd consecutive season in the OTP Bank Liga and 108th year in existence as a football club.

First team squad

Transfers

Summer

In:

Out:

Winter

In:

Out:

List of Hungarian football transfers summer 2012
List of Hungarian football transfers winter 2012–13

Statistics

Appearances and goals
Last updated on 2 June 2013.

|-
|colspan="14"|Youth players:
|-

|-
|colspan="14"|Players no longer at the club:

|}

Top scorers
Includes all competitive matches. The list is sorted by shirt number when total goals are equal.

Last updated on 2 June 2013

Disciplinary record
Includes all competitive matches. Players with 1 card or more included only.

Last updated on 2 June 2013

Overall
{|class="wikitable"
|-
|Games played || 47 (30 OTP Bank Liga, 9 Hungarian Cup and 8 Hungarian League Cup)
|-
|Games won || 29 (19 OTP Bank Liga, 7 Hungarian Cup and 3 Hungarian League Cup)
|-
|Games drawn || 10 (7 OTP Bank Liga, 0 Hungarian Cup and 3 Hungarian League Cup)
|-
|Games lost || 8 (4 OTP Bank Liga, 2 Hungarian Cup and 2 Hungarian League Cup)
|-
|Goals scored || 110
|-
|Goals conceded || 56
|-
|Goal difference || +54
|-
|Yellow cards || 96
|-
|Red cards || 9
|-
|rowspan="1"|Worst discipline ||  Marek Střeštík (5 , 2 )
|-
|rowspan="1"|Best result || 12–0 (A) v Babóti SE - Hungarian Cup - 25-09-2012
|-
|rowspan="2"|Worst result || 1–4 (A) v Debreceni VSC - OTP Bank Liga - 28-07-2012
|-
| 1–4 (A) v Egri FC - Ligakupa - 20-02-2013
|-
|rowspan="3"|Most appearances ||  Marek Střeštík (36 appearances)
|-
|  Nemanja Andrić (36 appearances)
|-
|  Đorđe Kamber (36 appearances)
|-
|rowspan="1"|Top scorer ||  Nemanja Andrić (21 goals)
|-
|Points || 97/141 (68.79%)
|-

Nemzeti Bajnokság I

Matches

Classification

Results summary

Results by round

Hungarian Cup

League Cup

Group stage

Classification

Knockout phase

References

External links
 Eufo
 Official Website
 UEFA
 fixtures and results

Győri ETO FC seasons
Hungarian football clubs 2012–13 season